New College of Florida is a public liberal arts college in Sarasota, Florida. It was founded in 1960 as a private institution known simply as New College, spent several years merged into the University of South Florida, and in 2001 became an autonomous college, the eleventh independent school of the State University System of Florida. Upon achieving independence, the school adopted its current name: New College of Florida.

The school is distinguished by its unusual "contract system," in which students are given written evaluations instead of grades and agree to semester-long contracts in which a certain number of classes must be passed. For example, in a "three out of five" contract, a student who failed two classes would face no penalty, although one who failed three classes would risk losing the entire semester's credits. The system was devised to encourage academic experimentation and foster curiosity about disparate topics outside one's usual course of study. 
New College students are required to complete an undergraduate thesis project and baccalaureate exam, during which the student presents and defends their project to a committee of professors.

Undergraduates complete a step-by-step career education plan that integrates professional development with their academic experience. Students work with their personal career coach and faculty sponsor to undertake professional internships, undergraduate research, community service, and other hands-on learning opportunities that complement their academic coursework.

New College has by far the smallest student population in the State University System of Florida with only 675 students as of the Fall 2020 semester.

History
New College was conceived during the late 1950s, and founded by local civic leaders in 1960 as a private college for academically talented students. Financial assistance was provided by the Board of Homeland Missions of the United Church of Christ. George F. Baughman served as the first president from 1961 to 1965.

The school offers a liberal arts education valuing freedom of inquiry and the responsibility of individual students for their own education were to be implemented through a unique academic program. Open to students of all races, genders, and religious affiliations, New College opened its doors in 1964 to a premier class of 101 students. 
Faculty members included the historian and philosopher Arnold J. Toynbee, who was lured out of retirement to join the charter faculty.

By 1972, New College's ranks had swelled to more than 500 students and it had become known for its teaching-focused faculty, its unique courses and curricula, and its fiercely independent and hard-working students. As the 1970s progressed, although New College's academic program continued to mature, inflation threatened to undermine the economic viability of the institution. By 1975, the college was $3.9 million in debt and on the brink of insolvency, and the University of South Florida (USF) expressed interest in buying the land and facilities of the near-bankrupt college to establish a branch campus for the Sarasota and Bradenton area.

In an unusual agreement, the New College Board of Trustees agreed to hand over the school's campus and other assets to the state, at the time valued at $8.5 million, in exchange for the state paying off its debts and agreeing to continue to operate the school as a separate unit within the USF system. The agreement stated that New College was to receive the same funding, per-student, as other programs at USF. The former New College Board of Trustees became the New College Foundation, and was required to raise money privately to supplement the state funds to reach the total necessary to run New College, at the time about a third of New College's $2-million-a-year operating budget. Under the agreement, New College was re-christened the "New College of the University of South Florida". USF started a Sarasota branch program that shared the bayfront campus, and the schools began an uneasy relationship that would last for the next twenty-five years, with New College and the University of South Florida through its Sarasota branch program sharing the campus.

As part of a major reorganization of Florida's public education system in 2001, New College severed its ties with USF, became the eleventh independent school in the State University System of Florida, and adopted its current name, New College of Florida.  The Florida legislature officially designated New College as the honors college for the state of Florida. As part of its establishment as an independent university, the University of South Florida was directed to relocate its facilities away from the New College campus, which it did on August 28, 2006, when it opened a new campus for USF Sarasota-Manatee. New College and USF Sarasota-Manatee continued to share campuses until the new campus was completed.

The college is a member of the Council of Public Liberal Arts Colleges.

2023 appointment of conservative trustees
In early 2023, Governor Ron DeSantis performed what was described by some as a "conservative overhaul" of the college's board of trustees, appointing six new members including Christopher Rufo, Matthew Spalding, Charles R. Kesler, Mark Bauerlein, Debra Jenks and Eddie Speir. Of those, the first four are well-known conservative activists who appear to live outside Florida. DeSantis chief of staff James Uthmeier said that "It is our hope that New College of Florida will become Florida’s classical college, more along the lines of a Hillsdale of the South." At its first meeting, on January 31, 2023, the new board fired President Patricia Okker and installed Richard Corcoran as its interim President.

Governance
New College is governed by a 12-member board of trustees who serve staggered four-year terms. Of the twelve members, three must be residents of Sarasota County and two must be residents of Manatee County.

Campus
Situated between Sarasota Bay and the Sarasota-Bradenton International Airport, the college lies within a public educational, cultural, and historic district that includes the John and Mable Ringling Museum of Art and the Asolo Repertory Theatre. The primary campus is located on the former Edith and Charles Ringling estate. The campus also includes portions of The Uplands, a residential neighborhood that is bounded by the historic bayfront campus to the south, Tamiami Trail to the east, Sarasota Bay to the west, most of which used to be a portion of the estate, and the Seagate property to the north.

The campus's most remarkable structures are its three Florida 1920s boom time, grand-scale residences: College Hall was the home of Edith and Charles Ringling; Cook Hall was the home of Hester Ringling Lancaster Sanford; and Caples Hall was the home of Ellen and Ralph Caples. The well-appointed structures date from the early to mid-1920s, are listed on the National Register of Historic Places, and are similar in style to the adjacent John and Mable Ringling Museum of Art and their residence, Cà d'Zan. Today, these buildings are used as classrooms, meeting rooms, and offices and their expansive properties provide sites for the modern developments on the bayfront campus.

The campus is also home to several examples of high modernist architecture designed by I. M. Pei. These buildings include a complex of student residences known as "Pei", a cafeteria, and a student center. The other dormitories are Dort, Goldstein, and Palmer B. Five new dormitory buildings have been opened in the 2007–2008 school year, with the most recent opened in October 2007.  They currently are referred to as V, W, X, Y, and Z.  For most of the buildings naming donors have not been set in stone completely, but the largest building, "Z" has been named by the Pritzker family. They have donated several times to the college, including a library reading room and the Marine Sciences building; The "X" dorm was renamed in honor of Ulla R. Searing and the "W" dorm was renamed in honor of Lee and Bob Peterson.

The Jane Bancroft Cook Library is a joint-use library for both New College students, and the University of South Florida's Sarasota-Manatee campus. It is also a resource for Manatee Community College as well as for local educators and residents. The local library collection has several hundred thousand items and access to over 11 million items through the State University Libraries system. The library also has a large collection of electronic resources available through the USF library system.

The Pritzker Marine Biology Research Center, which opened in 2001, overlooks Sarasota Bay and draws bay water to supply its research aquariums. The facility supports the biology, marine biology, and environmental sciences programs, three of the most popular fields of study at New College.

In 2005, a long range campus master plan was developed through public workshops held by the design teams from the Folsom Group of Sarasota, Moule & Polyzoides of Pasadena, California, Harper Aiken Partners of St. Petersburg, Florida, Biohabitats Inc. of Canton, Georgia, and Hall Planning and Engineering of Tallahassee, Florida. Extensive participation by the students, faculty, administration, residents of the community, and staff members of local governmental agencies was a major feature of the workshops. The husband and wife architectural firm includes Liz Moule and Stefanos Polyzoides, co-founder of the Congress for the New Urbanism.

In 2011, the college opened a new Academic Center and the adjacent Robert and Beverly Koski Academic Plaza. The Academic Center was awarded Gold LEED certification in the fall of 2011 for a number of sustainable features: 
 Toilets flush using residual rainwater from the roof and A/C condensate.
 Specially designed tanks built-in under the adjoining Koski Plaza collect storm water.
 Special CO2 room sensors measure air quality and adjust the A/C system accordingly.
 High-efficiency windows let in natural light.
 Pavers and high reflective roofing materials reflect sunshine.
 More than 85 percent of construction site debris was recycled.

The most recent addition to the campus, in 2017, is a 22,000-square-foot addition to the Heiser Natural Sciences Center. The addition, which increased space by 50 percent, added modern physics, chemistry and biology labs, as well as classrooms and office space. It also received Gold LEED certification for its sustainability features.

Academics

Undergraduate programs
Four core principles form the base of New College's academic philosophy: (1) each student is responsible in the last analysis for his or her own education, (2) the best education demands a joint search for learning by exciting teachers and able students, (3) students' progress should be based on demonstrated competence and real mastery rather than on the accumulation of credits and grades, (4) students should have, from the outset, opportunities to explore in-depth, areas of interest to them. To the end of putting this philosophy into practice, New College uses a unique academic program that differs substantially from those of most other educational institutions in four key ways:
 Narrative evaluations: at the completion of each course, students receive an evaluation written by the instructor critiquing their performance and course work, along with a satisfactory, unsatisfactory, or incomplete designation. Letter grades and grade-point-averages are not used at New College. 
 Contract system: At the start of each semester, students negotiate a contract with their faculty adviser, specifying their courses of study and expectations for the semester.  At the completion of the term, the academic adviser compares the student's performance with the requirements defined in the contract, and determines whether the student has "passed" the contract, or not. Among other requirements, completing seven contracts is a prerequisite to graduation by the college.
 Independent study projects: The month of January is reserved for independent projects at New College, a period when no traditional courses are held. Independent Study Projects run the gamut from short, in-depth, academic research projects to internships, lab work, and international exchanges. Students are required to complete three independent study projects prior to being graduated.
 Senior thesis: Each student is required to write an original and lengthy thesis in their discipline, and to defend it before a committee of at least three faculty members. Depending on the area of concentration of each student, a senior thesis may take the form of an original research paper, a scientific or social-scientific experiment or research study, or an original composition. This requirement usually is completed during the final two semesters of a student's fourth year.
The academic structure described above is implemented through classes and research projects in a diverse array of subjects in the humanities, social sciences, and the natural sciences. The college's enrolls a little over 800 undergraduate students, has an average class size of eighteen for undergraduate classes, and a student to faculty ratio of 10 to 1.

Graduate programs 
New College offers a Master's degree in Applied Data Science. The MS in Applied Data Science is an adaptation of the original MS in Data Science, featuring a greater focus of application to industry. The MS in Data Science was created in 2015, and began with a founding cohort of seven students. As of 2022, there are 27 students enrolled in the Applied Data Science graduate program. The MS in Applied Data Science is a 2-year program, featuring a 100% employment rate upon graduation. Students of the MS in Applied Data Science program are required to complete a paid practicum during the final semester of their degree. New College undergraduates pursuing any major can apply for the 3+2 path, putting them on track to graduate with a bachelor's degree and an MS in Applied Data Science in five years. New College's MS in Applied Data Science was ranked #25 on Fortune's "Best Master’s in Data Science Programs in 2022."

Cost of attendance 
For the 2021–22 school year, tuition and fees for in-state residents came to $6,916, or $192 per credit hour. Tuition and fees for both out-of-state residents and international students totaled $29,944, or $832 per credit hour. New College charges both in-state and out-of-state residents $10,892 for room and board each academic year. For international students, the cost of room and board at New College is $12,992. These costs have been stable for the past few years. For Master's students, the cost of first-year tuition and fees is $11,383.92 for in-state residents, and $28,067.28 for out-of-state and international students. On average, New College students take on the least debt compared to undergraduates from any other school in the State University System. Only 33% of New College students took on any loans with an average loan of about $5500 - at comparable institutions, 53% of students took on loans with an average loan around $6300. New College recognizes Bright Futures scholarships and offers additional scholarships to the vast majority of admitted students.

Cross College Alliance 
The Cross College Alliance is composed of five institutions: New College of Florida, Ringling College of Art + Design, The Ringling/FSU, State College of Florida Sarasota-Manatee, and University of South Florida Sarasota-Manatee. The alliance aims to foster community between these local organizations through shared resources. Students at New College of Florida may cross-register at any of the three other colleges in the alliance.

Recognition 
As of 2022, New College of Florida was ranked No. 5 among public "National Liberal Arts Colleges", as well as No. 76 among all "National Liberal Arts Colleges", by U.S. News and World Report. Eighty-six New College students have been awarded Fulbright scholarships since the college's founding. New College is a profiled college by the non-profit organization Colleges That Change Lives. The organization recommends New College for its flexible academic path as well as its consistency in producing successful graduates.

Student life

New College Student Alliance
The New College Student Alliance (NCSA) is New College's student government organization. Many decisions relating to student and campus events, academic decisions and policies, the allocation of funds, and recently, the revision of the campus master plan, and the building of new dorm complexes are influenced by the opinions of the student body via the NSCA.  "Towne Meetings", held monthly in Palm Court, are the main forum for public debate and are open to all students, faculty, and staff.

Athletics
New College of Florida does not have any varsity athletic teams but it has a club sailing team which is a member of the South Atlantic Intercollegiate Sailing Association (SAISA). The New Crew SRQ rowing club was launched in 2021 and trains at Nathan Benderson Park. The New College powerlifting team competes in regional and state competitions against other Florida colleges and universities.

Alumni

New College graduates are relatively few (about 4,000), although everyone who has attended the college for more than one semester, regardless of graduation status, is considered a New College alumnus. The college dates them by the year they entered New College, not by graduation year. For example, a student entering New College in 1985 would be considered by the college as part of the "Class of 1985." Among these should be counted Mark Weiser, visionary Xerox PARC computer scientist, who conceived of the approach to evolving computer interfaces known as "ubiquitous computing." Weiser attended New College from 1970 through 1974, continuing his education at the University of Michigan (Masters 1977, PhD. 1979).

Among the most prominent New College graduates are William Dudley, former president of the Federal Reserve Bank of New York; Ambassador Nancy McEldowney, National Security Advisor to Vice President Harris; University of Pennsylvania law professor and vice provost Anita L. Allen, named to the Presidential Commission for the Study of Bioethical Issues; the late mathematician and Fields medalist William Thurston; Margee Ensign, current president of Dickinson College and former president of American University of Nigeria; Jennifer Granick, surveillance and cybersecurity counsel at the ACLU and former civil liberties director at the Stanford Center for Internet and Society and the Electronic Frontier Foundation; bestselling author of Getting Things Done David Allen (author); national MSNBC, NBC and Telemundo anchor José Díaz-Balart; founder of the Multidisciplinary Association for Psychedelic Studies Rick Doblin;  Emmy Award-winning TV writer/producer Carol Flint; former U.S. representative Lincoln Díaz-Balart; David M. Smolin, professor of law and director for Cumberland School of Law's Center for Biotechnology, Law, and Ethics; "Mother of Sharks" Melissa Cristina Márquez, a marine biologist and science communicator; academic and poet who was a finalist for the 2021 National Book Award for Poetry, Jackie Wang; and attorney Robert Bilott, whose work is the subject of the 2019 movie Dark Waters.

Notes

References

Further reading 
 Paulson, Lawrence and Luke Salisbury. 2014. First-Class Times: Writing about New College's Charter Classes. Maryland: Shambling Gate Press., pp. 224.
 Elmendorf, John. 1975. Transmitting information about experiments in higher education. New York: Academy for Educational Development, Inc., pp. 43.
 Glasser Kay E. 1977. The New College Story as told by One Hundred And Three Alumni. Ph.D., pp. 20.

External links 

 
1960 establishments in Florida
Ne
Buildings and structures in Sarasota County, Florida
Educational institutions established in 1960
Education in Sarasota County, Florida
Liberal arts colleges in Florida
Public honors colleges
Public universities and colleges in Florida
Universities and colleges accredited by the Southern Association of Colleges and Schools
Tourist attractions in Sarasota County, Florida
Education in Sarasota, Florida